Hanzhong University was a private university in South Korea.  The campus was located in the city of Donghae, Gangwon province. In 2018 Ministry of Education ordered closure of the university due to its significant finance troubles and corruption of the founders and leadership after the special audit conducted following the lowest evaluation the university received in 2015.

Academics

The university's undergraduate offerings are divided among four colleges:  Humanities and Social Sciences, Arts and Athletics, Nursing, and Engineering.  Graduate training is offered through schools of Education, Management Information, and Business, as well as the general graduate school, which offers instruction in civil engineering and international business.

History

The university began in 1992 as Donghae Technical College. It became a four-year institution, Donghae University, in 1999. In 2005, name was changed to Hanzhong University.

Rating
In 2015, an evaluation by the Ministry of Education rated the university in the lowest E group, resulting in the Ministry halting its monetary support and barring the University from all state-funded programs.

Sister schools

International ties exist with the University of Illinois and University of Michigan in America, and with several Chinese institutions:  Heilongjiang College, Chengdong University of Traditional Chinese Medicine, Henan University of Finance and Economics, and Dandong Normal Senior School.

See also
List of colleges and universities in South Korea
Education in South Korea

References

External links 
  Official school website, in Korean

Universities and colleges in Gangwon Province, South Korea
Educational institutions established in 1991
Donghae City
1992 establishments in South Korea
1991 establishments in South Korea
Defunct universities and colleges in South Korea